The Cobbler is a 2014 American magic realism comedy-drama film directed by Tom McCarthy and co-written by McCarthy with Paul Sado. The film stars Adam Sandler, Cliff "Method Man" Smith, Ellen Barkin, Melonie Diaz, Dan Stevens, and Steve Buscemi. It was screened in the Special Presentations section at the 2014 Toronto International Film Festival. The film was released on March 13, 2015, by Image Entertainment. The film was panned by critics and was a box office bomb.

Plot
On New York City's Lower East Side in 1903, a group of Jewish men gather in a cobbler's shop to discuss a neighborhood problem. Gergerman has been threatening their businesses, harassing them and their families. Handing a pair of Gergerman's shoes to the cobbler, Pinchas Simkin, he takes them to the shop basement and uses a special stitching machine on the shoes. His young son Herschel enters, and he explains how important the machine is.

In the present day, the great-grandson of Pinchas, Max Simkin is the cobbler. Jimmy operates the barber shop next door. Carmen Herrera, a young woman of the Lower East Side is fighting against large developers who are tearing down parts of the neighborhood to build huge complexes. Max doesn't seem to care at all about the shop. He lives at home with his ailing mother Sarah and wishes they could see Max's father again.

Local thug Leon Ludlow brings his shoes to the shop to resole them. Max's current stitching machine fails, so he uses the old one. He checks Ludlow's shoe size; it's 10 1/2, the same as his. Max tries the shoes on and transforms into Ludlow. He uses the machine on other shoes, and realizes what he can do with it.

Max experiments living as someone else, going to Chinatown as a Chinese man, going to a restaurant as one and leaving as another, not paying. Taryn brings in her British boyfriend Emiliano's shoes, and Max uses them. As Emiliano, he goes to a bar, noticed by beautiful women. One approaches him, noting that she once saw him leaving with a man. Going to his home as Emiliano, he finds Taryn taking a shower and she invites him to join her. He eagerly starts to undress, then realizes if he takes off a shoe, he will no longer be Emiliano, so he leaves. Max decides to make his mother happy by using the shoes of his father Abraham. Having dinner with Sarah as Abraham gives her one more night of happiness.

The next morning Sarah has died, so he and his family sit shiva for the week. When he returns to work, Ludlow demands his shoes back or he'll kill Max. Using several pairs of shoes to disguise himself, Max follows Ludlow to his apartment, witnessing Ludlow extorting businesses along the route. Disguised as Ludlow, Max is let into Ludlow's apartment by Ludlow's girlfriend Macy, who has had enough of Ludlow's abuse and is packing her bags to leave. Max searches for Ludlow's watch collection, and finds a cache of weapons. The real Ludlow returns and starts to strangle Max (still in Ludlow's shoes) until Max tasers him and ties him up. Max, still disguised as Ludlow, goes with two of Ludlow's associates to where a man is being tortured. About to kill the captive, Max calls off the henchmen. Afterward, they meet slum lord Elaine Greenawalt, who gives him an envelope filled with cash to buy out a tenant.

Max returns to Ludlow's apartment wearing someone's stilettos, but Ludlow has freed himself from his constraints. Ludlow ambushes and attempts to kill Max, but during the scuffle is stabbed with the stilettos and killed. Max goes directly to the police to report the killing, but when they go to the apartment, all the evidence is gone. Returning to the shoe repair shop, Max finds the stilettos have been mysteriously returned to the shop counter, along with his bag of shoes and the envelope of cash. Jimmy confronts Max about his recent odd behavior, telling Max the secret, that his father did the same thing before he disappeared.

Max goes with Carmen to visit Mr. Solomon, the man Greenawalt has been threatening. Despite the threats, Mr. Solomon refuses to leave, as he has lived there for decades and raised his daughter there. Max devises a plot to bilk Greenawalt out of thousands while still letting Solomon keep his home. When Greenawalt realizes she is being tricked, she goes to Solomon's and threatens to kill him and kill his daughter. Max has arranged to have this all recorded on camera by the local news, and Greenawalt is arrested. 

Max's life starts to return to normal. Carmen goes into the shop and invites him to dinner. Impersonating Ludlow, he gives the watches to Macy, apologizing. As he leaves, he is abducted by a group of men led by the man he had saved. They are about to drive off when their car is struck.

Max wakes up in Jimmy's barber shop and is offered some water and a pickle, which Jimmy says help with the transition from one body to another. Max asks how he knew that, Jimmy takes off his shoes revealing that he is actually Abraham, his father. The real Jimmy is in the Caribbean. Both elated and angry, Max hugs his dad, then is shown a huge collection of shoes that he's gathered over the years. Abraham then takes Max in his limo through the city, telling him the story of how the stitching machine came into their family.

Cast
 Adam Sandler as Max Simkin
 Method Man as Leon Ludlow
 Dustin Hoffman as Abraham Simkin 
 Steve Buscemi as Jimmy 
 Melonie Diaz as Carmen Herrara 
 Ellen Barkin as Elaine Greenawalt 
 Dan Stevens as Emiliano
 Sondra James as Anna O'Hara 
 Dascha Polanco as Macy
 Lynn Cohen as Sarah Simkin
 Fritz Weaver as Mr. Solomon
 Kim Cloutier as Taryn
 Adam B. Shapiro as Schneider
 Danny Mastrogiorgio as Brian
 Elena Kampouris as Alexia
 Ethan Khusidman as Herschel Simkin
 Jared Sandler as cool bar guy

Production
On September 19, 2013, Adam Sandler was in talks to join Tom McCarthy's The Cobbler, which began shooting in November 2013. Voltage Pictures fully financed the film and it was produced by Mary Jane Skalski. On November 12, 2013 Dan Stevens joined the cast. Dustin Hoffman and Steve Buscemi also joined cast during shooting on November 18, 2013. Other cast members include Melonie Diaz, Method Man, Sondra James, Kevin Breznahan, Greta Lee and Craig Walker. On September 9, 2014, Image Entertainment acquired the US distribution rights to the film for $3.5 million.

Filming
Principal photography began on November 11, 2013, in New York City, before Sandler began his next project Men, Women & Children.

Release and reception
The Cobbler was released in a limited release and through video on demand on March 13, 2015, and since its release, it has been reported to be the biggest box-office flop of Adam Sandler's career – earning only $24,000 at the U.S. box office in its opening weekend. Outside of North America, the film earned $6.5 million and another $2.3 million from domestic video sales.

Critical response
The Cobbler was panned by critics. On Rotten Tomatoes, the film has a rating of 10%, based on 72 reviews, with a weighted average score of 3.2/10. The website's critical consensus reads, "The Cobbler represents a slight step up from Adam Sandler's recent comedies, but while its cloying sentiment proves a more palatable substitute for his usual crass humor, it still isn't terribly compelling." On Metacritic, the film has a score of 23 out of 100, based on reviews from 22 critics, indicating "generally unfavorable reviews".

Uri Klein of Haaretz pointed out that while The Cobbler is "one of the few times in Sandler's career in which he has chosen to work for a director with a certain pedigree", and "the plot has fantastical impersonation elements that links it to comedians of an earlier era, such as Jerry Lewis and Danny Kaye", the result is unsatisfying in terms of both plot and characters. The A.V. Club chose the film as the worst film of 2015. The Cobbler was discussed extensively on the October 22nd episode of Chapo Trap House during which the film was largely panned by the show's hosts.

Jared Mobarak of The Film Stage gave the film a positive review, noting that "embraces its slightness to warm hearts" and praised Method Man in particular for his performance.

Lawsuit 
The Cobbler was a litigant to lawsuit, where an individual was accused of illegally downloading this movie. The significance is that the judge ruled that the IP address provided by the Internet Service Provider did not meet the test to definitively associate a person with a specific activity.

Accolades

References

External links
 
 
 
 

2014 films
Yiddish-language films
Films about Jews and Judaism
Films about shapeshifting
2010s fantasy comedy-drama films
American fantasy comedy-drama films
Films scored by John Debney
Films directed by Tom McCarthy
Films set in New York City
Films shot in New York City
Magic realism films
Voltage Pictures films
Fiction about shoemakers
2010s English-language films
2010s American films